Telephone numbers in Estonia follow a closed telephone numbering plan.

The numbering plan of Estonia was reorganised from 1 May 2003 into closed numbering plan. All calls inside Estonia are local; trunk codes are not used.

Landline phone numbers have 7 digits, mobile numbers can have either 7 or 8 digits, machine-to-machine (M2M) numbers can be up to 12 digits.

Telephone numbers are portable between locations and operators.

The country code for Estonia is +372, adopted in 1993. This replaced the +7 014 area code, used under Soviet rule.

Numbering plan
  32x xxxx      Landline
  33x xxxx      Landline
  35x xxxx      Landline
  38x xxxx      Landline
  39x xxxx      Landline
  40xx xxxx     eFax Service
  43x xxxx      Landline
  44x xxxx      Landline
  45x xxxx      Landline
  46x xxxx      Landline
  47x xxxx      Landline
  48x xxxx      Landline
  5xx xxxx      Mobile
  5xxx xxxx     Mobile
  60x xxxx      Landline
  61x xxxx      Landline
  62x xxxx      Landline
  63x xxxx      Landline
  64x xxxx      Landline
  65x xxxx      Landline
  66x xxxx      Landline
  67x xxxx      Landline
  68x xxxx      Landline
  71x xxxx      Landline
  72x xxxx      Landline
  73x xxxx      Landline
  74x xxxx      Landline
  75x xxxx      Landline
  76x xxxx      Landline
  77x xxxx      Landline
  78x xxxx      Landline
  79x xxxx      Landline
  8000 xxxx     International Freephone Service (IFS)
  8001 xxxx     International Freephone Service (IFS) Home Country Direct
  8002 xxx      Freephone
  8003 xxx      Freephone
  8004 xxx      Freephone
  8005 xxx      Freephone
  8006 xxx      Freephone
  8007 xxx      Freephone
  8008 xxx      Freephone
  8009 xxx      Freephone
  81xx xxxx     Mobile
  82xx xxxx     Mobile
  83xx xxxx     Mobile
  84xx xxxx     Mobile
  85xx xxxx     Mobile
  86xx xxxx     Mobile
  87xx xxxx     Mobile
  88x xxxx      Landline
  900 xxxx      Premium rate service

Example call
  When calling the Estonian number 799 2222:
  *From inside Estonia:       799 2222
  *From other countries: +372 799 2222

Special numbers
  112 - European emergency phone number
  116 - Harmonised European Short Codes (HESC)
  1247 - State helpline, +372 600 1247 from abroad
  1343 - Report an electric circuit breakdown 24 h

References

Estonia
Estonia communications-related lists
Telecommunications in Estonia